Tuition fees were first introduced across the entire United Kingdom in September 1998 under the Labour government of Tony Blair to fund tuition for undergraduate and postgraduate certificate students at universities; students were required to pay up to £1,000 a year for tuition. However, as a result of the new devolved national administrations for Scotland, Wales and Northern Ireland, there are now different arrangements for tuition fees in each of the nations.

History

Until 1976, tuition fees were paid by UK students attending a UK university who only qualified for the minimum grant of £50. In 1976 they were abolished, together with the £50 minimum grant.

In May 1996, Gillian Shephard, Secretary of State for Education and Employment, commissioned an inquiry, led by the then Chancellor of the University of Nottingham, Sir Ron Dearing, into the funding of British higher education over the next 20 years. This National Committee of Inquiry into Higher Education reported to the new Labour Government, in the summer of 1997, stating additional billions of funding would be needed over the period, including £350 million in 1998–99 and £565 million in 1999–2000, in order to expand student enrolment, provide more support for part-time students and ensure adequate infrastructure. The committee, as part of its brief, had controversially investigated the possibility of students contributing to the cost of this expansion, either through loans, a graduate tax, deferred contributions or means-testing state assistance, as their report notes:

20.40 We do not underestimate the strength of feeling on the issue of seeking a contribution towards tuition costs: nor do we dispute the logic of the arguments put forward. A detailed assessment of the issues has, however, convinced us that the arguments in favour of a contribution to tuition costs from graduates in work are strong, if not widely appreciated. They relate to equity between social groups, broadening participation, equity with part-time students in higher education and in further education, strengthening the student role in higher education, and identifying a new source of income that can be ring-fenced for higher education.

20.41 We have, therefore, analysed the implications of a range of options against the criteria set out in paragraph 20.2. There is a wide array of options from which to choose, ranging from asking graduates to contribute only to their living costs to asking all graduates to contribute to their tuition costs. We have chosen to examine four options in depth.

In response to the findings, the Teaching and Higher Education Act 1998 was published on 26 November 1997, and enacted on 16 July 1998, part of which introduced tuition fees in all the countries of the United Kingdom.

The act introduced a means-tested method of payment for students based on the amount of money their families earned. Starting with 1999–2000, maintenance grants for living expenses would also be replaced with loans and paid back at a rate of 9% of a graduate's income above £10,000.

Following devolution in 1999, the newly devolved governments in Scotland and Wales brought in their own acts on tuition fees. The Scottish Parliament established, and later abolished a graduate endowment to replace the fees. Wales introduced maintenance grants of up to £1,500 in 2002, a value which has since risen to over £5000.

In England, tuition fee caps rose with the Higher Education Act of 2004. Under the Act, universities in England could begin to charge variable fees of up to £3,000 a year for students enrolling on courses from the academic year of 2006–07 or later. The passing of the aforementioned act caused political controversy due to the influence of Scottish Labour MPs on the vote, which passed with a majority of just five. This policy was also introduced in Northern Ireland in 2006–07 and introduced in Wales in 2007–08. In 2009–10 the cap rose to £3,225 a year to take account of inflation. Following the Browne Review in 2010, the cap was controversially raised to £9,000 a year, sparking large student protests in London.

A judicial review against the raised fees failed in 2012, and so the new fee system came into use that September.

Further adjustments were put forth in the 2015 budget, with a proposed fee increase in line with inflation from the 2017–18 academic year onwards, and the planned scrapping of maintenance grants from September 2016. The changes were debated by the Third Delegated Legislation Committee in January 2016, rather than in the Commons. The lack of a vote on the matter has drawn criticism, as by circumventing the Commons the measures "automatically become law". Tuition fees and perceptions about them are directly linked to satisfaction.

In February 2018, then-Prime Minister Theresa May launched a review of post-18 education funding, including university funding and possible alternatives to tuition fees and loans. The review panel was expected to report back in early 2019, but as of October 2019, the review is yet to be published.

In February 2020, Labour Party leadership candidate Keir Starmer (who went on to win the 2020 Labour leadership election), promised to maintain the Labour Party's commitment to abolishing tuition fees.

Current systems

England

In England, undergraduate tuition fees are capped at £9,250 a year for UK and Irish students. Due to Brexit, starting in autumn 2021, EU, other EEA and Swiss nationals are no longer eligible for the home fee status, meaning higher fees and no access to UK government loans unless they have been granted a settled or pre-settled status under the EU Settlement Scheme. Around 76% of all institutions charged the full amount of tuition fees in 2015–16. A loan of the same size is available for most universities, although students at private institutions are only eligible for £6,000 a year loans.

Since 2017–18, the fee cap is meant to be raised in line with inflation. Maintenance grants are also available to current students in England, although these are scheduled to cease with the 2016–17 academic year. Maintenance loans are available for living costs, and these are means-tested. These loans are scheduled to increase in size for 2016–17 when the maintenance grant system is phased out. There will be a vote in the autumn to consider a further increase effective with the 2017–18 year. Several universities have already advertised fees of £9,250 for the year in anticipation of such a vote passing. In October 2017, Prime Minister Theresa May announced that tuition fees would be temporarily frozen at £9,250. In 2018, this temporary freeze remains in place and it is likely to be extended as a university funding review is carried out. The latter, which was launched by Theresa May, is being chaired by Philip Augar.

In the 2015 spending review, the government also proposed a freeze in the repayment threshold for tuition fee loans at £21,000; a figure which was previously set to rise with average earnings. The changes, if passed, will affect all Plan-2 tuition fee loans, backdated to cover loans taken out from 2012.

Effect
Many commentators suggested that the 2012 rise in tuition fees in England would put poorer students off applying to university. However, the gap between rich and poor students has slightly narrowed (from 30.5% in 2010 to 29.8% in 2013) since the introduction of higher fees. This may be because universities have used tuition fees to invest in bursaries and outreach schemes. In 2016, The Guardian noted that the number of disadvantaged students applying to university had increased by 72% from 2006 to 2015, a bigger rise than in Scotland, Wales or Northern Ireland. It wrote that most of the gap between richer and poorer students tends to open up between Key Stage 1 and Key Stage 4 (i.e. at secondary school), rather than when applying for university, and so the money raised from tuition fees should be spent there instead.

A study by Murphy, Scott-Clayton, and Wyness found that the introduction of tuition fees had "increased funding per head, rising enrolments, and a narrowing of the participation gap between advantaged and disadvantaged students".

Northern Ireland
Tuition fees are currently capped at £4,030 in Northern Ireland, with loans of the same size available from Student Finance NI. Loan repayments are made when income rises above £17,335 a year, with graduates paying back a percentage of their earnings above this threshold.

Scotland
Tuition fees are handled by the Student Awards Agency Scotland (SAAS), which does not charge fees from what it defines as "Young Students", or "Dependent Students". Young Students are defined as those under 25, without dependent children, marriage, civil partnership or cohabiting partner, who have not been outside of full-time education for more than three years. Fees exist for those outside the young student definition. The tuition fees are usually £1,820 for undergraduate courses for Scottish & Irish students, and £9,250 for students from the rest of the UK. Due to Brexit, from Autumn 2021 EU students will have to pay international tuition fees in Scotland ranging from £10,000 - £26,000 per year depending on the university and degree type unless they have been granted a settled or pre-settled status under the EU Settlement Scheme. At the postgraduate level, Scots and RUK usually pay the same amount, commonly between £5,000 and £15,000 per year, while tuition fees for international students can run as high as £30,000 per year.

Fee discrimination against students from the rest of the UK has been challenged in the past but deemed legal. The Scottish government confirmed in April 2019 that, with regards to tuition fees, EU students would be treated the same as Scottish students for their whole course if they begin studies up until 2020, regardless of how Brexit would be enacted.

The system has been in place since 2007 when graduate endowments were abolished. Labour's education spokesperson Rhona Brankin criticised the Scottish system for failing to address student poverty. Scotland has fewer disadvantaged students than England, Wales or Northern Ireland and disadvantaged students receive around £560 a year less in financial support than their counterparts in England do.

Wales
In Wales tuition fees are capped at £9,000 for all UK and EU students. This is lower than in Scotland (for UK students from outside Scotland) and England. Welsh students may apply for a non-means tested tuition fee loan to cover 100 percent of tuition fee costs wherever they choose to study in the UK.

Welsh students used to be able to apply for fee grants of up to £5,190, in addition to a £3,810 loan to cover tuition fee costs. However, the Welsh Government changed this system after the Diamond Review was published. Today students may only access a tuition fee loan rather than a grant. The changes became effective for students starting University in September 2018. The Welsh Government argued this would allow for higher maintenance loans and grants and these costs are the biggest barrier for poorer students to attend University.

Interest fees
Students and graduates pay interest fees on student loans. Interest starts being added to the student loan from when the first payment is made. In 2012 this rate was set at the retail price index (RPI) plus up to 3% depending on income. Students who started university between 1998 and 2011 pay Bank of England base rate plus 1% or RPI, whichever is lower. Students who started university before 1998 pay interest set at the RPI rate. As a consequence of the 2012 change, students who graduate in 2017 will pay between 3.1% and 6.1% interest, despite the Bank of England base rate being 0.25%. In 2018, interest fees rose again, this time to 6.3% for anyone who started studying after 2012.

If those who have taken out a student loan do not update their details with the Student Loans Company when receiving a letter or an email to update their employment status, or upon leaving the UK for 3 or more months, start a new job or become self-employed, or stop working, then they can possibly face a higher interest rate on their loan.

In June 2019, the Brexit Party stated it would scrap all interest paid on student tuition fees and has suggested reimbursing graduates for historic interest payments made on their loans.

In August 2019, government figures uncovered by the Labour Party showed that "students will owe a staggering £8.6bn in interest alone on their loans within five years ... almost double the current debt".

Possible alternatives
There have been two main proposed alternative ways of funding university studies: from general taxation or by a graduate tax.

Funding from general taxation
Tuition is paid for by general taxation in Germany, although only around 30% of young people gain higher education qualification there, whereas in the UK the comparable figure is 48%. Fully or partly funding universities from general taxation has been criticised by the Liberal Democrats as a 'tax cut for the rich and a tax rise for the poor' because people would be taxed to pay for something that many would not derive a benefit from, while graduates generally earn more due to their qualifications and only have to pay them back.

Jeremy Corbyn, former Labour leader, stated that he would have removed tuition fees and would have instead funded higher education by increasing National Insurance and Corporation Tax. In the long term this plan would have been expected to cost the government about £8 billion a year.

In July 2017 Lord Adonis, former Number 10 Policy Unit staffer and education minister largely responsible for introducing tuition fees, said that the system had become a "Frankenstein's monster" putting many students over £50,000 in debt. He argued the system should either be scrapped or fees reverted to between £1,000 and £3,000 per the initial scheme.

Graduate tax
During the 2015 Labour leadership election, Andy Burnham said that he would introduce a graduate tax to replace fees. He was ultimately unsuccessful in his bid for leadership. A graduate tax has been criticised because there would be no way to recover the money from students who move to a different country, or foreign students who return home.

See also
 Free education
 Right to education
 Student Left Network
 Universal access to education

References

External links

 Text of Higher Education Act 2004, which introduced top-up fees
 BBC News Q&A: Student Fees
 The Guardian: All Change (guide to fees)
 Student Loans Company (the body responsible for providing and administering student loans in the UK)
Dearing Report

Articles which contain graphical timelines
Education finance in the United Kingdom
Higher education in the United Kingdom